The 30. Internationale Jänner Rallye 2013 was the first round of the 2013 European Rally Championship. The eighteen stage asphalt, snow and ice rally took place over 3–5 January 2013. Jan Kopecký won the rally with an amazing recovery, after being in third place at almost 30 seconds from the lead, with just three stages until the end of the rally.

Results

Special stages

References 

Janner
Janner Rallye
Jänner Rallye